Miniestadi (meaning in English "Mini Stadium"), officially named "Miniestadi", was a football stadium in Barcelona, Catalonia, Spain. The 15,276-seat stadium was situated across from Camp Nou, the home stadium of FC Barcelona. The stadium was home to FC Barcelona B, FCB's reserve team, as well as their women's team and Juvenil A. The stadium is now replaced by the newly built Estadi Johan Cruyff, which was completed on 27 August 2019.

Sporting use
The stadium was home to FC Barcelona B, the reserve side of the famous Catalan club, until they moved to Estadi Johan Cruyff in the Ciutat Esportiva Joan Gamper sports complex for the 2019-20 season.

The stadium was also home to FC Barcelona C until July 2007, when they disbanded. It was also home to the Barcelona Dragons, an NFL Europe American football team, until they were disbanded in 2003.

It occasionally hosted the national team of Andorra as well.

Concerts
Bob Dylan performed here with Carlos Santana on 28 June 1984, during his 1984 European Tour.

Queen performed at the stadium during their Magic Tour on 1 August 1986.

David Bowie performed, on two consecutive nights, at the stadium during his Glass Spider Tour on 7–8 July 1987.

Elton John performed at the stadium during his One Tour on 21 July 1992.  The concert was recorded and released on VHS and DVD.

Present

As part of the Espai Barça project, the Mini Estadi was demolished at the conclusion of the 2018-2019 season  following the opening of the Estadi Johan Cruyff to make way for the Nou Palau Blaugrana. The new Estadi Johan Cruyff is built at the Ciutat Esportiva Joan Gamper campus, which will serve as the new home of Barcelona's reserve and women's teams.

References

External links

 Mini Estadi at fcbarcelona.com
 Estadios de Espana 
 Mini Estadi at Google Maps

FC Barcelona Atlètic
Barcelona Dragons
Football venues in Barcelona
Rugby union stadiums in Spain
American football venues in Spain
Sports venues completed in 1982